Dovedale, sold as Dovedale Blue, is a blue cheese. It is named after the Dovedale valley in the Peak District, near where it is produced.

Dovedale is a soft, creamy cheese with a mild blue flavour. It is made from full fat cow's milk. Unusually for a British cheese, it is brine dipped, rather than dry-salted, giving it a distinctive continental appearance and flavour.

In 2007, Dovedale was awarded Protected designation of origin (PDO) status, meaning that it must be traditionally manufactured within  of the Dovedale valley. The original cheese was invented and is still produced at the Hartington Creamery in Derbyshire;  a version is also produced by the Staffordshire Cheese Company in Cheddleton, Staffordshire.

References

Blue cheeses
British products with protected designation of origin
Cheeses with designation of origin protected in the European Union
Cow's-milk cheeses
English cheeses